6th CFCA Awards

Best Film: 
 Schindler's List 
The 6th Chicago Film Critics Association Awards honored the finest achievements in 1993 filmmaking.

Winners
 Best Actor: 
 Liam Neeson - Schindler's List
 Best Actress: 
 Holly Hunter - The Piano
 Best Cinematography: 
 Schindler's List - Janusz Kamiński
 Best Director: 
 Steven Spielberg - Schindler's List
 Most Promising Actor: 
 Leonardo DiCaprio - What's Eating Gilbert Grape
 Most Promising Actress: 
 Ashley Judd - Ruby in Paradise
 Best Film: 
 Schindler's List
 Best Foreign Language Film: 
 The Piano (Australia/New Zealand/France)
 Best Score: 
 "The Piano" - Michael Nyman
 Best Screenplay: 
 Schindler's List - Steven Zaillian
 Best Supporting Actor: 
 Ralph Fiennes - Schindler's List
 Best Supporting Actress: 
 Joan Allen - Searching for Bobby Fischer

References
http://www.chicagofilmcritics.org/index.php?option=com_content&view=article&id=49&Itemid=59

 1993
1993 film awards